Jakub Piotr Kiwior (born 15 February 2000) is a Polish professional footballer who plays as a centre-back for Premier League club Arsenal and the Poland national team.

Club career

FK Železiarne Podbrezová
Kiwior made his Fortuna Liga debut for Železiarne Podbrezová against Nitra on 16 February 2019. Kiwior played the entirety of the 3–1 victory at pod Zoborom.

MŠK Žilina
In August 2019, Kiwior's transfer to MŠK Žilina was announced. He made his debut in the yellow jersey on 10 August 2019 during an away fixture against Ružomberok. While Žilina grabbed a three-goal lead in the first half, Ružomberok scored two in the second period and hence Kiwior was brought on to secure the defence, as a replacement for Lukáš Jánošík. Šošoni managed to keep the 3–2 win and remained undefeated in the league.

Over a month later, in his second appearance, Kiwior had debuted in the starting-XI against ViOn Zlaté Moravce. While Žilina's defence remained unbeaten, the strikers had failed to score and then match concluded in a goal-less tie. On 9 November Kiwior had recorded his first assist with Žilina. At Štadión pod Dubňom, Žilina was behind Ružomberok by two goals in the second half. Kiwior, a first-half replacement, managed to find Ján Bernát with a pass and narrow the score. Still, Žilina lost 2–1.

During the season, he also made sporadic appearances for the reserves competing in 2. Liga.

During the coronavirus pandemic, as Žilina had entered liquidation to survive financially and had consequently released 17 players, Kiwior remained unaffected.

Spezia Calcio
On 31 August 2021, Kiwior signed for Serie A side Spezia on a four-year deal.

Arsenal
On 23 January 2023, Kiwior moved to Arsenal on a long-term contract, making his debut against Sporting on 9 March 2023 in the Europa League last 16 first leg as Arsenal drew 2–2. He made his home and Premier League debut as a substitute in Arsenal's 4–1 win against Crystal Palace on 19 March 2023.

International career
Kiwior made his debut as a starter for Poland against Netherlands in a 2022–23 UEFA Nations League 2–2 away draw on 11 June 2022. In November 2022, he was named in the 26-man squad for the 2022 FIFA World Cup in Qatar. He started in all four of Poland's games during the tournament.

Career statistics

Club

International

References

External links
 Jakub Kiwior at the Arsenal F.C. website
 Jakub Kiwior at the Premier League website
 Jakub Kiwior  at the MŠK Žilina website
 Jakub Kiwior at the FK Železiarne Podbrezová website
 
 
 Jakub Kiwior at Futbalnet

2000 births
Living people
People from Tychy
Polish footballers
Poland international footballers
Poland youth international footballers
Poland under-21 international footballers
Association football defenders
FK Železiarne Podbrezová players
MŠK Žilina players
Spezia Calcio players
Arsenal F.C. players
Slovak Super Liga players
2. Liga (Slovakia) players
Serie A players
Premier League players
2022 FIFA World Cup players
Polish expatriate footballers
Expatriate footballers in Belgium
Expatriate footballers in Slovakia
Expatriate footballers in Italy
Expatriate footballers in England
Polish expatriate sportspeople in Belgium
Polish expatriate sportspeople in Slovakia
Polish expatriate sportspeople in Italy
Polish expatriate sportspeople in England